Mid Surrey was a county constituency in Surrey, England 1868 — 1885.  It returned two Members of Parliament to the House of Commons of the UK Parliament elected by the bloc vote system.

History
The constituency was created under the Second Reform Act for the 1868 general election, and abolished by the Redistribution of Seats Act 1885 for the 1885 general election.

Political history
The seat elected a brief series of Conservatives.

Successor seats
The 1885 Act took from 2 to 16 the metropolitan seats in the north-east of the county — that is the zone north-east of Wimbledon and Croydon coming from 1889 into the newly formed County of London. It also founded six single-member county constituencies (seats) to cover the rump bulk of the county, commonly referred to at the time as the non-metropolitan county.  The Act thus abolished the West, Mid and East Surrey divisions double seat-areas that comprised the county. As Surrey was now split into single-representative areas this met a Chartist objective, discouraging the frequent collusion between candidates or parties which had beset multi-member constituencies (specifically plurality-at-large voting, for which "bloc(k) vote" in Britain was the term used). These six distinctly county (non-metropolitan) divisions the Act numbered, named (and detailed as summarised in outline below):
 
The North-Western or Chertsey Division (usually recorded as Chertsey, Surrey N.W. or North-West) - included Woking and Egham
The South-Western or Guildford Division (as style shown above) - included Godalming, Farnham and surrounds
The South-Eastern or Reigate Division (as style shown above) - included Dorking sessional division save for two parishes in No. 4.
The Mid or Epsom Division (as style shown above) - included Kingston's southern and eastern sessional division components
The Kingston Division (invariably Kingston or Kingston-upon-Thames) - included Richmond
The North-Eastern or Wimbledon Division (as style shown above) - included sessional division of Croydon except its core and north in the Metropolis; plus Caterham, Chelsham, Farley, Warlingham.

Boundaries
1868–1885: The Hundreds of Kingston, Reigate and so much of that of Wallington as lay to the west of the parishes of Croydon and Sanderstead, and so much of the Hundred of Brixton as lay to the west of the parishes of Streatham, Clapham and Lambeth.

Members of Parliament

Election results

Elections in the 1860s

Elections in the 1870s
Brodrick succeeded to the peerage, becoming Viscount Midleton and causing a by-election.

Baggallay was appointed Solicitor-General for England and Wales, requiring a by-election.

Baggallay was appointed a Judge of The Court of Appeal, and resigned.

Elections in the 1880s

 

Peek's resignation caused a by-election.

References

Parliamentary constituencies in South East England (historic)
Constituencies of the Parliament of the United Kingdom established in 1868
Constituencies of the Parliament of the United Kingdom disestablished in 1885
Politics of the London Borough of Lambeth
Politics of Surrey